Lord Bridges may refer to Mark Bridges, 3rd Baron Bridges, the incumbent holder of the peerage title Baron Bridges.

It may also refer to:

Edward Bridges, 1st Baron Bridges, former UK Cabinet Secretary
Thomas Bridges, 2nd Baron Bridges, former UK Ambassador to Italy
George Bridges, Baron Bridges of Headley, former UK government minister for Brexit